Sandra Julieta Torres Casanova ( born 5 October 1955) is a Guatemalan politician who was First Lady of Guatemala from 2008 to 2011 and an unsuccessful candidate for president in 2015 and 2019.

Early life and education
Sandra Julieta Torres Casanova was born on the 5 October 1955, in the municipality of Melchor de Mencos, in the department of Petén. She is the daughter of Enrique Torres and Teresa Casanova. She has a degree in Communication Sciences from the University San Carlos de Guatemala. She also has a master's degree in Public Politics from the University of Rafael Landívar de Guatemala.

Career 

She has spent most of her professional lifetime promoting politics, plans, programs, projects and laws concerning social development, specially of women, children and people with special needs. Within the legal initiatives that she has promoted from inside her political party – the National Unity of Hope (UNE) – (of which her former husband is the Leader and in which she is also a director) are:

 Initiative of Law Against Feminicide. Approved in the first semester of 2008.
 Initiative of Law of Responsible Parenting. Approved in August 2008.

Sandra Torres de Colom was founder of the Coordinadora Nacional de la Mujer (National Coordinator of the Women) for the political party Unidad Nacional de la Esperanza, through which more than 30,000 Guatemalan women (Garifuna and Xinca amongst them) have channeled their specific demands. The action in favor of women was reflected within the corporate area. Sandra Torres, as a businessperson, worked at private companies and had been responsible for textile production and administration of clothing factories. 
She also was president of Consejo de Cohesión Social (Counsel of Social Cohesion), an institute in charge of orienting social investment for the eradication of extreme poverty and combating poverty in general. The group employs programs and projects focused on improving the coverage and quality of education, healthcare, infrastructure, sustainability and national reconstruction (specifically pertaining to the disasters Hurricane Stan, landslides in the county of La Unión, Zacapa, and Storm 16).

Presidential candidate 
During the 2008 presidential term of her husband Álvaro Colom, she had a proactive role in many social programs, creating a platform for the distribution of government aid to the poor. She became quite popular among the poor and hence she decided to run for president in the 2011 Guatemalan general election. However, she was disqualified from being a candidate since the Constitution of Guatemala, in subsection c of article 186, prohibits relatives of the President and the Vice President on duty, to run as candidates. Even though she divorced her husband President Álvaro Colom, the move was seen as an attempt to circumvent the electoral law.

With no restrictions from the Constitution she was able to run in the Presidential election of 2015 as a candidate for the same political party that her ex-husband was elected, the social-democratic National Unity of Hope party (UNE). This time she finished second in the first round of the election on 6 September, narrowly beating the third-placed Manuel Baldizón, and qualifying for the runoff against first-placed Jimmy Morales. She lost the election in the second round.

She ran again in the 2019 Presidential election, and led in some polls, though she had faced a legal challenge by the Constitutional Court over potential campaign finance violations. during the last election, which she denied.

Torres ran for the social-democratic National Unity of Hope party (UNE).

Torres says she would provide "comprehensive solutions like development, fight against poverty and job opportunities" to try to convince Guatemalans to stay in the country rather than migrating to the United States.

Torres pledged health and education reforms as well as jobs to stem the flow of migration to the US. In an appeal to more conservative voters, she vowed to oppose abortion and same-sex marriage. She did not attend either the first round or second round debates, despite having been invited to both.

She was defeated in the second round of the 2019 Presidential election by Alejandro Giammattei.

Arrest 
On 2 September 2019, she was arrested at her home on charges of violating campaign finance rules.

References

External links
  Sandra Torres Twitter
 Unidad Nacional de la Esperanza Political Party Guatemala
 GW Today 

|-

|-

1955 births
21st-century Guatemalan women politicians
21st-century Guatemalan politicians
First ladies of Guatemala
Living people
National Unity of Hope politicians
People from Petén Department